David W. Harwell was an associate justice and chief justice on the South Carolina Supreme Court. He was sworn in as chief justice on December 19, 1991, with his term to commence upon the retirement of Chief Justice George Gregory, Jr. on January 1, 1992. He died on September 30, 2015.

References

Chief Justices of the South Carolina Supreme Court
Justices of the South Carolina Supreme Court
1932 births
People from Florence County, South Carolina
2015 deaths
20th-century American judges